CTFA may refer to:

 Chinese Taipei Football Association, the governing body of football in the Republic of China (Taiwan)
 Chinese Taipei Film Archive, the former name of Taiwan Film and Audiovisual Institute in Taipei, Taiwan
 Cosmetic, Toiletry, and Fragrance Association, the former name of Personal Care Products Council in Washington D.C., United States